The Mersey Railway was the first part of the passenger railway connecting the communities of Liverpool, Birkenhead, and now the rest of the Wirral Peninsula in England, which lie on opposite banks of the River Mersey, via the Mersey Railway Tunnel. The railway opened in 1886 with four stations using steam locomotives hauling unheated wooden carriages; in the next six years the line was extended and three more stations opened. Using the first tunnel under the Mersey the line is the world's oldest underground railway outside London.

Because the steam locomotives created a polluted atmosphere in the tunnel, many passengers reverted to using the river ferries and the railway was bankrupt by 1900. Recovery came after the railway adopted electric traction in 1903. The Mersey Railway remained independent after the railway grouping of 1923, although it became closely integrated with the electric train services operated by the London, Midland and Scottish Railway over the former Wirral Railway routes after 1938. The Mersey Railway was nationalised, along with most other British railway companies, in 1948.

The tunnel and railway are still in use today as part of the Wirral Line of the Merseyrail rail network.

History

Origins
Records exist of a ferry service across the River Mersey between Birkenhead on the west bank and Liverpool on the east since the middle ages. In 1332 the monks of Birkenhead Priory were granted exclusive rights to operate a ferry; following the dissolution of the monasteries these rights passed through a number of operators eventually to the township of Birkenhead. It is recorded that Marc Isambard Brunel suggested a road tunnel when designing the Birkenhead docks and from the 1850s a railway tunnel under the Mersey was proposed several times. The Mersey Pneumatic Railway received Royal Assent for a single line pneumatic railway in 1866 but failed to raise the necessary capital. In 1871 the Mersey Railway was given the necessary permissions for an orthodox two track railway connecting the Birkenhead Railway near their  station through a tunnel under the Mersey to an underground station serving Liverpool. However the company found it difficult to raise the necessary funds until Major Samuel Isaac undertook to build the railway in 1881. He contracted construction to John Waddell, who appointed Charles Douglas Fox and James Brunlees as Engineers.

Three tunnels were to be dug, one for the two tracks, a drainage tunnel and a ventilation tunnel. A  diameter ventilation tunnel was dug as the pilot heading. Some 38 million bricks were used for the construction of the main tunnel. When the tunnel was opened, fans on both banks changed the air in the tunnel every seven minutes.

The geology of the riverbed meant that the plans were changed and at the deepest section the drainage and ventilation tunnels combined. The grade on the Liverpool side was increased to 1 in 27. There were two pumping stations, Shore Road Pumping Station on the Birkenhead bank near Hamilton Square and Georges Dock Pumping Station on Mann Island on the Liverpool Bank. The Railway's Workshop was built next to Birkenhead Central; stabling was also provided at Birkenhead Park.

Opening and extensions

The Mersey Railway was formally opened on 20 January 1886 and public services started on 1 February. The route had four new stations: Green Lane, Birkenhead Central and Hamilton Square in Birkenhead and James Street station in Liverpool. Green Lane and Birkenhead Central were below ground level in open cuttings whereas James Street and Hamilton Square were deep underground and accessed by lifts.

In 1888 a branch tunnel to Birkenhead Park station opened, with a connection to the Wirral Railway.  This was followed in 1891 by an extension from Green Lane to bay platforms at the Birkenhead Railway's Rock Ferry station, and in 1892 the tunnel was extended from James Street to a new underground station at Liverpool Central.

The railway opened with steam locomotives hauling four-wheeled -long wooden carriages, with first-, second- and third-class accommodation provided in unheated compartments. In 1900 in the peak periods trains left the Rock Ferry terminus every  minutes and the Birkenhead Park terminus every 15 minutes, giving a train every 5 minutes between Hamilton Square and Liverpool Central. At off-peak times this was reduced to a train every  minutes, alternately from the Rock Ferry and Birkenhead Park branches. The scheduled journey time between Rock Ferry and Central was 14 minutes; between Birkenhead Park and Central, 10 minutes.

Connecting ferries and trains allowed Paris to be reached in under 15 hours.

Electrification
The traffic peaked in 1890, when ten million passengers were carried, and then declined. Two years previously the company had been declared bankrupt and receivers appointed, because it was unable to pay the charges on its debt. Steam locomotives running at five-minute headways left a dirty atmosphere in the tunnel that the mechanical ventilation was unable to remove, so many passengers preferred the ferries.

Some other urban railways had been constructed for electric traction: in 1890 the City and South London underground tube had opened with electric traction, followed in 1893 by the more local Liverpool Overhead Railway. Plans for electrification of the Mersey Railway in 1895 were shelved because the company and its investors were fighting in the courts. In 1897 a new board of directors was elected, and in 1898, £500 was released for further expert advice that recommended electrification at a cost of £260,000 (equivalent to £ in ). By then, the railway had attracted the attention of George Westinghouse, an American in the UK looking for business for his UK works, the British Westinghouse Electric and Manufacturing Co. Ltd, that opened at Trafford Park in 1899. Westinghouse considered the railway would be profitable with electric traction and undertook to fund the project, promising to complete in eighteen months. Electrification was approved by Parliament in the Mersey Railway Act of 1900, which also terminated the bankruptcy, and in July 1901 the Westinghouse contract was signed.

All electrical equipment was shipped from the US, including power system plant equipment. A power station was built at the Shore Road pumping station and was designed to accommodate the extension of electrification to the Wirral Railway, although that did not occur until 1938. The conductor rails were fed direct, without any distribution. Four-rail 600 V DC electrification was installed, with the positive outer rail set  from the running rail. The new electric multiple units, initially marshalled as 2-car or 4-car sets, had British-built wooden bodies on US bogies. 24 motor cars and 33 trailer cars were provided. The driving positions controlled all the motors on the train by the means of a low voltage control signal.

After inspection by the Board of Trade, the line was approved as fit for traffic on 3 April 1903. The last steam trains ran on Saturday 2 May and the current to the electrified rails was switched on at 3:30 am. At 4:53 am the first electric train arrived at Liverpool Central, and for the Sunday morning trains ran at 3-minute intervals without passengers. Passengers were admitted when the advertised Sunday service started at noon.

The stations were cleaned, whitewashed and electrically lit. A service was provided every three minutes from Liverpool Central to Hamilton Square and journeys were faster: Central to Rock Ferry was eleven minutes, down from fifteen minutes and the Central to Birkenhead Park journey was reduced by two minutes, down to eight minutes.

There was a maximum of four cars per train in 1904, which was raised to five cars in 1909. In 1923, automatic signalling was commissioned at Liverpool Central and in 1927 the island platform was widened, the work being completed in a weekend. The maximum number of cars in a train was raised to six in 1936, after the tunnels at the east end of Liverpool Central had been extended.

Wirral Railway

As a local railway the Mersey Railway remained independent in the 1923 grouping, although the Wirral Railway became part of the London, Midland and Scottish Railway (LMS). The Wirral had authority to electrify its lines, but had not done so, and passengers making through journeys had to change at Birkenhead Park. In 1926 discussions started on electrification and through running. The Mersey Railway electric multiple units were modified to run to the Wirral railway, and at the same time heaters and air compressors were added.

In 1938 the LMS introduced new lightweight three car multiple units that were later, under British Rail, to be classified Class 502.

Nationalisation and legacy
In 1948, on nationalisation of the railways, the Mersey Railway became the Mersey section of the London Midland Region. In 1956 these trains were replaced by Class 503 units, similar to the LMS Class 502 design, and the fourth rail removed. The last of the American-designed cars was withdrawn a year later.

The original two platforms at Liverpool Central were reused as part of the Northern Line. The tunnel and railway are still in use today as part of the Wirral Line of the Merseyrail commuter rail network.

Shore Road Pumping Station in Birkenhead was a museum until closure sometime before 2014. Georges Dock Pumping Station on Mann Island in Liverpool is a grade II listed building.

Rolling stock

Steam locomotives

For the opening of the line, eight powerful 0-6-4 tank locomotives were obtained from Beyer, Peacock and Company, fitted with condensing apparatus for working in the tunnel. Designated as Class I, a ninth followed within six months. Beyer Peacock also built six 2-6-2T tank locomotives in 1887 (Class II) and three further 2-6-2T (Class III) were built by Kitson and Company in 1892.

As electrification progressed, the old rolling stock was advertised for sale. An attempt to sell the 18 locomotives and 96 carriages by auction in June 1903 proved unsuccessful – the auctioneer had to remind the bidders that he was not selling scrap. It was September before the first locomotive was sold; it would take another two years to sell all-bar-one of the locomotives. The last locomotive — which had been retained for working permanent way trains — was sold in January 1908.

The first to be sold was No. 5 Cecil Raikes, which was bought by Shipley Collieries for £750. They came back and bought No. 8 for £650; but not before Alexandra (Newport and South Wales) Docks and Railway had bought all six of the Class II locomotives for £3,450. They became ADR 6–11 (not in order). Alexandra Docks later bought four more locomotives: Three 0-6-4T (Nos. 2, 3 and 6), and one Class III 2-6-2T  (No. 16), these becoming 24–22 and 25. All ten ADR locomotives passed to the Great Western Railway in January 1922, and were withdrawn between January 1923 and May 1932.

The other two Class III locomotives were bought by Whitwood Colliery for £1,240.

The last four locomotives (Nos. 1, 7, 9 and 4) were sold to J & A Brown (as their Nos. 5–8) for use on the Richmond Vale railway line in New South Wales, Australia. No. 4 Gladstone had been retained by the Mersey Railway until 1907 for departmental use, but was then replaced by Metropolitan Railway A Class (4-4-0T) No. 61, built by Beyer Peacock. This was replaced in 1927 by an earlier Metropolitan Railway 4-4-0T, No. 7.

Two of the Class I locomotive have been preserved: No. 5 Cecil Raikes is preserved at the Museum of Liverpool; and No. 1 The Major is preserved at the NSW Rail Museum, Thirlmere, New South Wales.

Locomotive-hauled coaching stock
Between 1904 and 1907 thirteen four-wheeled gas-lit coaches were sold to the Liskeard and Looe Railway. Built by the Ashbury Railway Carriage and Iron Company Ltd between 1885 and 1888, the sale price was between £20 and £70 each. In 1912, the six surviving examples were sold on to the Rhondda and Swansea Bay Railway.

Electric multiple units

In 1903 24 motor cars and 33 trailers were provided by Westinghouse. The stock was of an American design, with a clerestory roof and open gated ends. Unheated accommodation was in saloons and the wooden bodies were British built, and the bogies had been made by Baldwin Locomotive Works in America. First- and third-class cars were provided, the first-class seats being of natural rattan and the third-class seats being moulded plywood. The livery was maroon with white roofs and "Mersey Railway" in gold leaf on the upper fascia panels. Air brakes were provided with storage reservoirs that were recharged from static compressors at the terminal stations. The motor cars were powered with Westinghouse motors controlled by the Westinghouse low voltage multiple unit train control system.

An additional four trailers were received in 1908 followed in 1923 by two more motor cars and in 1925 a new five-car train. To allow the introduction of 6-car trains in 1936, ten trailer units were ordered. The later cars did not have a clerestory roof, but any car could work in multiple with any other car.

When the cars were modified to run to the Wirral railway, heaters and air compressors were added. The cars were replaced by vehicles similar to the Wirral Railway units in 1956–57.

Car no. 1, a first-class motor coach, was destroyed in a fire at Derby Litchurch Lane Works, where it had been taken for overhaul in preparation for restoration and preservation.

Preservation
Only two of the Class I locomotive have been preserved: No. 5 Cecil Raikes is preserved at the Museum of Liverpool; and no. 1 The Major is preserved at the NSW Rail Museum, Thirlmere, New South Wales, Australia.

References and Notes

Notes

References

Bibliography

Historic publications

, link with images

External links

 A Stevengraph of the Mersey Railway Tunnel
 UrbanRail.net article on Merseyrail

Rail transport in Liverpool
Rail transport in Merseyside
Railway tunnels in England
Railway lines opened in 1886
Railway companies disestablished in 1948
Tunnels completed in 1886
Electric railways in the United Kingdom
Tunnels in Merseyside
British companies disestablished in 1948
British companies established in 1886